Michael Whiddett (born 1981) also known as "Mad Mike", is a New Zealand drifting racer. He is sponsored by Red Bull. Whiddett has also raced motocross from the age of six and placed second at the New Zealand 1997 Pro junior 85cc Motocross Champs.

Car history 
Whiddett has a strong relationship with Mazda and has been drifting in Mazda engines since he started in 2007 in a Mazda RX-7. His cars have all been named in a similar way including:

 NIMBUL, a Lamborghini Huracan with a Liberty Walk bodykit and Fi EXHAUST, makes approximately 800-900HP
 MADBUL, a Mazda FD RX-7 with a 26B quad rotor, naturally aspirated engine. MADBUL was given a new look in 2017 to have RX-3 front end bodywork and renamed MADBUL 7.3 due its design combination of RX-7 and RX-3
 BADBUL, a Mazda RX-8 with a 20B three rotor turbo engine
 HUMBUL, a Mazda FD RX-7 with a 26B quad rotor, twin turbo engine
 RADBUL, a Mazda NC MX-5 with a 26B quad rotor, twin turbo engine
 RADBUL Gen2, a Mazda NC MX-5 with ND MX-5 body panels and a 26B quad rotor, twin turbo engine
 RUMBUL, a Mazda B2000 based Stadium Truck with a naturally aspirated 13B twin rotor engine
He also owns a Mazda REPU with a 13B twin rotor engine called PITBUL. And a Mazda Luce Sedan set up to take up to 3 passengers called MADCAB.

Whiddett's current project car is a 2022 Mazda 3 (BP). It will feature a quad rotor Wankel engine with 1,200hp and is being developed to race in the famous Pikes Peak International Hill Climb in celebration of the race's 100th anniversary.

Racing history 
Whiddett has competed in Formula Drift in the United States in the 2010, 2015 and 2016 seasons and was named the Most Improved Driver for the 2010 season. He has also competed in Formula D Asia and Formula D Japan. He is the first professional Mazda driver to clench a professional drifting championship.

Whiddett has also competed in off-road racing. In 2015, he participated in the Stadium Super Trucks race at the Sand Sports Super Show, an opportunity he received after meeting series founder Robby Gordon at the Goodwood Festival of Speed. He drove E. J. Viso's No. 5 truck during the weekend, with points earned by Whiddett going to Viso in the championship. After starting second for the first race, he finished fourth; this was followed by a retirement in Race 2 with an engine problem. Although he rolled in the final race, he finished seventh.

2018 – Formula Drift Japan Series 
 Won championship

2017 – Formula Drift Japan 

 Finished 1st at Okuibuki Motorsports Park

2016 – Formula Drift 
 Finished Top 16 at Long Beach
 Finished Top 32 at Orlando Speed World
 Finished Top 16 at Atlanta
 Finished 25th at Autodrome Saint-Eustache (Lowest season finish)
 Finished Top 32 at Monroe
 Finished 8th at Texas Motor Speedway (Highest season finish)
 Finished Top 16 at Irwindale

2016 – Formula Drift Japan 
 Finished 1st at Ebisu Circuit West Course
 Finished 9th at Okayama International Circuit

2015 – Formula Drift 
 Finished Top 16 at Atlanta
 Finished Top 16 at Orlando Speed World
 Finished 14th at Monroe (Lowest season finish)
 Finished Top 16 at Texas Motor Speedway
 Finished 5th at Irwindale (Highest season finish)

2014 – Formula Drift Asia 
 Finished 21st at Fuji Speedway
 Finished 9th at Sydney Motorsports Park

2013 – Formula Drift Asia 
 Finished 9th at Calder Park

2010 – Formula Drift 
 Finished Top 32 at Atlanta
 Finished Top 32 at Wall
 Finished Top 32 at Monroe
 Finished 10th at Las Vegas (Highest season finish)
 Finished 29th at Sonoma (Lowest season finish)
 Finished Top 16 at Irwindale

2009 – Formula Drift Asia 
 Finished 1st at Wonder World Amusement Park in 2009
 Finished 3rd Malaysia Agro Exposition Park in 2009

Achievements 
2009, finished first at Wonder World Amusement Park in the Formula Drift Asia series.
In 2014, he was the first New Zealand drift driver to receive an award from Motorsport New Zealand for outstanding achievement.
2015, finished fifth at Irwindale Formula Drift for his highest finish in the series.
2016, finished first at Okayama International Circuit in the Formula Drift Japan series.

Motorsports career results

Stadium Super Trucks 
(key) (Bold – Pole position. Italics – Fastest qualifier. * – Most laps led.)

References

External links
 Official website 

New Zealand motorsport people
Living people
Year of birth uncertain
Drifting drivers
Stadium Super Trucks drivers
1981 births
Australian Endurance Championship drivers
New Zealand racing drivers